Black Pear Tree is an EP by The Mountain Goats and Kaki King, released in 2008 as a vinyl only and tour only EP. Track 6's title is a reference to Super Mario Bros.

Track listing

"Black Pear Tree" – 3:46
"Mosquito Repellent" – 2:49
"Bring Our Curses Home" – 3:20
"Supergenesis" – 3:16
"Roger Patterson Van" – 2:48
"Thank You Mario but Our Princess Is in Another Castle" – 3:19

Personnel
Kaki King – vocals, drums, lap steel, guitar
John Darnielle - vocals, piano, organ, bells, guitar

References

Kaki King albums
The Mountain Goats EPs
2008 EPs